Reseda station is a station on the G Line of the Los Angeles Metro Busway system.  It is named after adjacent Reseda Boulevard, which travels north–south and crosses the east–west busway route. The station is in the Los Angeles districts of Reseda and Tarzana.

Service

Station Layout

Hours and frequency

Connections 
, the following connections are available:
 Los Angeles Metro Bus:

References

External links 

G Line (Los Angeles Metro)
Los Angeles Metro Busway stations
Reseda, Los Angeles
Tarzana, Los Angeles
Public transportation in the San Fernando Valley
Public transportation in Los Angeles
Bus stations in Los Angeles
2005 establishments in California